The Essential Babyface is the eleventh album by R&B artist, Babyface and is a compilation of some of his singles. The release is part of Sony BMG's The Essential series.

Track listing 
All songs are written by Babyface, except as noted.
"I Said I Love You" - 4:05
"Never Keeping Secrets" - 4:50
"Every Time I Close My Eyes" - feat. Mariah Carey & Kenny G - 4:57
"Talk to Me" - 4:54
"When Can I See You" - 3:49
"For the Cool in You" (Babyface, Daryl Simmons)- 4:53
"My Kinda Girl" (Babyface, Daryl Simmons, L.A. Reid) - 4:39
"Whip Appeal" Babyface, Perri "Pebbles" Reid - 5:47
"Soon as I Get Home" - 5:08
"Well Alright" (From Poetic Justice) - 4:00
"Day (That You Gave Me a Son)" - 4:26 
"How Come, How Long" - feat. Stevie Wonder (Babyface, Stevie Wonder) - 5:11
"This Is for the Lover in You" - feat. Jeffrey Daniels, Howard Hewett, LL Cool J & Jody Watley (Howard Hewett, Dana Meyers) - 4:01
Medley: "I'll Make Love to You/End of the Road" [Live] (Babyface, Daryl Simmons, L.A. Reid) - 2:01
Medley: "I'll Make Love to You/End of the Road" (Continued) [Live] (Babyface, Daryl Simmons, L.A. Reid) - 3:53

References

Babyface (musician) compilation albums
2003 greatest hits albums
Sony Music compilation albums
Epic Records compilation albums